Maria of Kvarngarden (Swedish: Maria på Kvarngården) is a 1945 Swedish drama film directed by Arne Mattsson and starring Edvin Adolphson, Viveca Lindfors and Irma Christenson. It was shot at the Centrumateljéerna Studios in Stockholm and on location in Uppsala. The film's sets were designed by the art director Bertil Duroj.

Cast
 Edvin Adolphson as 	Birger Jern
 Viveca Lindfors as 	Maria
 Irma Christenson as Birgit Jern
 Linnéa Hillberg as 	Barbro
 Åke Grönberg as 	Jakob
 Ernst Eklund as 	Major Lundgren
 Henrik Schildt as 	Erik Lundgren
 Guje Lagerwall as 	Karin
 John Botvid as 	John Gröndal
 Rune Carlsten as Defence Lawyer
 Åke Claesson as Judge
 Willy Peters as 	District Attorney
 Anders Nyström as 	Nils
 Axel Högel as 	Vicar

References

Bibliography 
 Qvist, Per Olov & von Bagh, Peter. Guide to the Cinema of Sweden and Finland. Greenwood Publishing Group, 2000.

External links 
 

1945 films
Swedish drama films
1945 drama films
1940s Swedish-language films
Films directed by Arne Mattsson
Swedish black-and-white films
1940s Swedish films